Andrew Gustafson (April 3, 1903 – January 7, 1979) was an American college football player, coach, and athletics administrator. He served as the head football coach at Virginia Agricultural and Mechanical College and Polytechnic Institute (VPI)—now Virginia Tech—from 1926 to 1929 and the University of Miami from 1948 to 1963, compiling a career head coaching record of 115–78–4. Gustafson was also the athletic director at Miami from 1963 to 1968. He was inducted into the College Football Hall of Fame as a coach in 1985.

Early life and playing career
Gustafson was born in Aurora, Illinois. As a halfback at the University of Pittsburgh, Gustafson scored the first touchdown ever in Pitt Stadium in 1925 against Washington and Lee.

Coaching career
Gustafson served as the head football coach of Virginia Tech from 1926 to 1929, where he compiled a 22–13–1 record.

Gustafson is considered one of the University of Miami's most successful coaches, with a record of 93–65–3 (.587). He led the Hurricanes to four seasons of eight wins or more and was the longest serving coach in school history. He is currently a member of the University of Miami Sports Hall of Fame. He also served as the athletic director of the school, following his retirement as a head coach.

Head coaching record

References

External links
 

1903 births
1979 deaths
American football halfbacks
Army Black Knights football coaches
Dartmouth Big Green football coaches
Miami Hurricanes athletic directors
Miami Hurricanes football coaches
Pittsburgh Panthers football coaches
Pittsburgh Panthers football players
Virginia Tech Hokies football coaches
College Football Hall of Fame inductees
Sportspeople from Aurora, Illinois
Sportspeople from Coral Gables, Florida
Coaches of American football from Illinois
Players of American football from Illinois